Bank television (BTB) is Ukrainian TV channel. Official television channel of the National Bank of Ukraine.

Created by the National Bank of Ukraine to improve the financial literacy of Ukrainian citizens. First TV Channel of Ukraine, which has a television production in HD. Exclusive Ukrainian partner of Bloomberg Television.

History 

BTB ("Bank television" LLC) was established with a registered capital of 10 million UAH by the board of National Bank of Ukraine to information for citizens and society timely, accurate and complete information about the policy of the National Bank.

In July 2011, "Bank television" received a satellite license. In August 2011, "Bank television" received air digital license in a national digital multiplex with the right to speak in HD ability.

Broadcasting started on 25 April 2012. Top managers: Ludmyla Obertynska (main producer), Svitlana Kryvoruchko (CEO), Svitlana Kolyada (editor-in-chief).

See also 

 Bloomberg Television
 Svitlana Kryvoruchko

External links 
 Official website

Defunct television stations in Ukraine
Television stations in Ukraine